The Very Best of 1927 is the first greatest hits album by the Australian pop rock band, 1927, released on 7 October 1996.
It includes tracks from the band's three studio albums (...Ish, The Other Side and 1927), with two previously unreleased songs.

Track listing

References

1996 greatest hits albums
1927 (band) albums
Compilation albums by Australian artists
Albums produced by Charles Fisher (producer)
Warner Music Group compilation albums